Amanullah or Amanallah is a male Muslim given name meaning the trust or protection of God. It may refer to:

Amānullāh Khān (1892–1960), ruler of Afghanistan from 1919 to 1929
Amanullah Khan (disambiguation), several other people called Amanullah Khan
Amanullah Jahanbani (1895–1974), Iranian senior general of Reza Shah Pahlavi
Amanullah Sailaab Sapi (1933–1979), Afghan poet and writer
Amanullah Asaduzzaman (1942–1969), Bengali student activist killed by police
Azzedine Amanallah (born 1956), Moroccan footballer
Amanullah (Bagram detainee), Afghan, captured in early 2004, and held in extrajudicial detention in the United States Bagram detention facility
Amanullah Zadran, former Taliban leader, Pashtun, Afghan government minister
Amanullah Khan Niazi, the deputy superintendent of Central Prison Karachi

See also
Aminullah
 List of Arabic theophoric names

Arabic masculine given names